Luke Jackson (born 1 January 1985 in Hobart, Tasmania) is a professional Australian boxer with a current record of 19–2 (8 KOs). Jackson turned professional in 2013 and is the current title holder of the WBA Oceania, WBO Oriental and Australian Featherweight titles.

A former Australian Institute of Sport boxing scholarship holder, he had an amateur record of 113–32 and won a bronze medal at the 2006 Commonwealth Games in Melbourne. He was named Team Captain for the 2010 Commonwealth Games in New Delhi and represented Australia at the 2012 Summer Olympics in the lightweight division, again as Team Captain.

Jackson didn't pick up the gloves until the age of 18 but showed a natural talent, coming third at the Australian titles in his first year and winning the title in his second year. The following year he was selected for the Melbourne Commonwealth Games, where he picked up his bronze medal. Explaining why he had stayed an amateur while others had turned professional, he told the Melbourne Age, "To win an Olympic gold medal is harder than any professional world title ever."

Professional career

Jackson vs. Frampton 
On August 18, 2018, Luke Jackson faced Carl Frampton for the vacant interim WBO world featherweight championship. Frampton dropped Jackson with an outstanding left hook to the body in the eight round. Jackson could not recover as Frampton continued his offensive at the beginning of the ninth round and managed to stop Jackson to win the fight via TKO.

Awards

Professional record: 19-2 (8KOs)
Amateur record:  113–32
Australian Title x 6
2006 Commonwealth Games, Melbourne - Bronze
2010 Commonwealth Games, India - Top 16
2005 World Championships, China - Top 32
2011 World Championships, Azerbaijan - Top 16
2012 Afrura Games, Darwin - Gold
2005 Oceania Championships, PNG - Bronze
2008 Oceania Championships, Samoa - Silver
2010 Oceania Championships, Canberra - Gold
2012 Oceania Championships, Canberra - Gold
2012 Olympic Games, London

Professional boxing record

References

External links

Luke Jackson - Profile, News Archive & Current Rankings at Box.Live

1985 births
Living people
Australian Institute of Sport boxers
Boxers at the 2012 Summer Olympics
Olympic boxers of Australia
Sportspeople from Hobart
Australian male boxers
Commonwealth Games bronze medallists for Australia
Boxers at the 2006 Commonwealth Games
Commonwealth Games medallists in boxing
Featherweight boxers
Medallists at the 2006 Commonwealth Games